Jean Paul Robert Filiol (9 May 1909 – date of death unknown) was a French militant, who was active in La Cagoule before the Second World War. After the war, he fled to Spain, where he worked for the local office of L'Oréal.

Filliol was one of the founding members of La Cagoule, after being previously a member of the Camelots du Roi. He was one of suspects in the killing of the Italian anti-fascists Carlo and Nello Rosselli in 1937, for which a French court convicted him to death in absentia in 1948. Filliol was interned in 1942, but released in 1944, on the orders of Joseph Darnand. He fled to Spain after the war, which refused to extradite him to stand trial in France.

References

1909 births
Year of death missing
20th-century French criminals
L'Oréal people